The Royal Enfield Continental GT is a Neo-retro Café Racer motorcycle produced by Royal Enfield (India). The first model to use the name, the Continental GT 250, was produced by the original Royal Enfield in the 1960s UK. The name was revived by the Indian manufacturer in the 2010s with the Continental GT 535 (now discontinued) and Continental GT 650.

Continental GT 250
Royal Enfield developed a new machine for the 1965 market, the 250 cc "Continental GT" based on existing mechanicals. Prior to the 1964 Earls Court UK national motorcycle exhibition in November, the factory arranged a long-distance run to demonstrate the reliability of the machine from John o' Groats in the north of Scotland to Land's End in Cornwall. With five road riders, pre-arranged fuel stops and factory mechanical back up, the route was covered in 22 hours 20 minutes. A sixth rider was John Cooper, a road-racer  who completed 8 laps of the Silverstone Grand Prix layout at race speeds.

Continental GT 535
The "Continental GT" was the most powerful machine from Royal Enfield when it was launched in 2014 and is reminiscent of the café racers of the 1960s, including the Enfield model from 1966. It was equipped with a 535 cm³ single-cylinder engine that develops almost 21 kW (30 hp) at 5100 rpm. The John o'Groats to Land's End route was also used with this model, and the construction again proved its reliability.

The Continental engine is a block engine - the crankshaft and gearbox are combined in one housing - and has intake manifold injection; The alternator is on the right of the crankshaft, the primary drive is on the left. The emission limits EURO 3 and 4 can be complied with. It has a 90 mm stroke and 84 mm bore and achieves a maximum torque of 44.0 Nm at a speed of 4000 rpm.

Continental GT 650

The Continental GT 650 alongside the Interceptor 650 was introduced in November 2017. The café racer has either a standard dual-seat or an optional solo seat with a seat hump. The fuel tank is more angular than the roadster's. Clip-on handlebars and rear-set pegs allow a sportier riding position.

References

Continental GT
Motorcycles introduced in 1963